Michael Whalen may refer to:

 Mike Whalen (born 1960), American athlete and coach
 Michael Whalen (composer) (born 1965), American composer
 Michael Whalen (actor) (1902–1974), American actor

See also
Michael Whelan (disambiguation)
Whalen